Vernon Archibald was an American baritone.  According to Joel Whitburn's chart approximations, he had best-selling recordings with renditions of "In the Valley of the Moon" and "Somewhere a Voice is Calling", both duets with Elizabeth Spencer released on Edison's Blue Amberol cylinders and Diamond Discs.  In the late 1920s Archibald was a founding member of the American Singers, who recorded for both Edison and Victor Records.  This group was frequently found on the radio and performing on the stage circuit.

References

American baritones
Pioneer recording artists
Edison Records artists
Year of birth missing
Year of death missing